The India national cricket team toured the Pakistan during the 1982–83 cricket season. They played six Test matches against the Pakistan cricket team, with Pakistan winning the series 3–0.

Test matches

1st Test

2nd Test

3rd Test

4th Test

5th Test

6th Test

One Day Internationals (ODIs)

Pakistan won the Wills Series 3-1.

1st ODI

2nd ODI

3rd ODI

4th ODI

References

External links
 Cricarchive
 Tour page CricInfo
 Record CricInfo

1982 in Indian cricket
1983 in Indian cricket
1982 in Pakistani cricket
1983 in Pakistani cricket
1982-83
Pakistani cricket seasons from 1970–71 to 1999–2000
International cricket competitions from 1980–81 to 1985